Stereoblindness (also stereo blindness) is the inability to see in 3D using stereopsis, or stereo vision, resulting in an inability to perceive stereoscopic depth by combining and comparing images from the two eyes.

Individuals with only one functioning eye always have this condition; the condition also results when two eyes do not function together properly.

Most stereoblind persons with two healthy eyes do employ binocular vision to some extent, albeit less than persons with normally developed eyesight. This was shown 
in a study in which stereoblind subjects were posed with the task of judging the direction of rotation of a simulated transparent cylinder: the subjects performed better when using two eyes than when using their preferred eye. They appeared to judge the direction of rotation from the images in each eye separately and then to combine these judgments, rather than relying on differences between the images in the two eyes. Also, purely binocular motion stimuli appear to influence stereoblind persons' sensation of self-motion. Furthermore, in some cases each eye can contribute to peripheral vision for one side of the field of view (see also monofixation syndrome).

However, there is an exception to this: Those with true congenital alternating squints have two healthy eyes, and the ability to switch (by choice) between seeing with either eye. However, stereoscopic and three dimensional vision can never be achieved in this condition (attempts to train those with true congenital alternating squints into binocular vision results in double vision, which can be irreversible).

Notable cases
It has been suggested that Dutch Old Master Rembrandt may have been stereoblind, which would have aided him in flattening what he saw for the production of 2D works. Scientists have suggested that more artists seem to have stereoblindness when compared with a sample of people with stereo-acuteness (normal stereo vision).

British neurologist Oliver Sacks lost his stereoscopic vision in 2009 due to a malignant tumor in his right eye and had no remaining vision in that eye. His loss of stereo vision was recounted in his book The Mind's Eye, published in October 2010.

In 2012 one case of stereoblindness was reportedly cured by watching a 3D film.

See also 
 Amblyopia
 Stereopsis
 Stereopsis recovery
 Strabismus
 "Stereo" Sue Barry

References

Bibliography

External links 

Vision
Blindness
3D imaging
Stereoscopy